Matejka Mohorič (born 17 July 1978) is a Slovenian biathlete. She competed in the women's relay event at the 1998 Winter Olympics.

References

1978 births
Living people
Biathletes at the 1998 Winter Olympics
Slovenian female biathletes
Olympic biathletes of Slovenia
Sportspeople from Kranj